Kotapahad is a village in Suryapet district in Telangana, India. It falls under Athmakur (S) mandal.

References

Villages in Suryapet district